The Canary long-eared bat (Plecotus teneriffae), also known as the Canary big-eared bat or Tenerife long-eared bat, is a species of vesper bat endemic to the Canary Islands. According to the IUCN, it is vulnerable to the risk of extinction. The species is primarily found in woodland habitat at elevations between 100 and 2300 m. It feeds mainly on moths. Roosting sites include caves, lava tubes and abandoned buildings.

Taxonomy and etymology
It was described as a new species in 1907 by British mammalogist Gerald Edwin Hamilton Barrett-Hamilton. He described it based on specimens in the British Museum of Natural History. The holotype had been collected by R. Gomez in April 1887 near the town of La Orotava. "R. Gomez" was likely Ramon Gomez, a local pharmacist who traded in medicines, old coins, and biological specimens from the Canary Islands. Its species name "teneriffae" is derived from Tenerife, which is one of the islands of the Canary Islands and the place where the holotype was collected.

Description
When Hamilton described it as a new species, he noted that it was similar in appearance to the brown long-eared bat, Plecotus auritus, but that it had "much larger wings."

Conservation
It is evaluated as vulnerable by the IUCN. It is threatened by habitat loss due to deforestation, use of pesticides near forest habitat, and loss of roosting sites due to building renovation. The remaining population is estimated to number between 500 and 2000. Only two breeding colonies, one each on La Palma (in the Cuevas de los Murciélagos) and Tenerife, are known; the larger La Palma colony is estimated to have declined by 80% in recent years. It is a protected species under Spanish law and international conventions (the Bonn Convention and Berne Convention).

References

External links
Photographs of this species

Plecotus
Bats of Africa
Endemic fauna of the Canary Islands
Mammals of the Canary Islands
Endangered fauna of Africa
Taxonomy articles created by Polbot
Mammals described in 1907
Taxa named by Gerald Edwin Hamilton Barrett-Hamilton